Tope Alabi (born 27 October 1970) in Ogun, a Nigerian gospel singer, film music composer and actress. She is also known as Ore ti o common and as Agbo Jesu. Tope Alabi obtained a Higher National Diploma in Mass Communication from the  polytechnic of Ibadan, after graduating in the year 1990, she worked as a correspondent at NTA (Nigerian Television Authority) in Ibadan. She started singing at the younger age, when she joined the choir in her local Catholic church at the age of seven. Tope has ability to produce different traditional and modern beats. She had composed and released several songs and couple with Christian slangs that made her different.

Biography 
Tope Alabi was born on 27 October 1970 in Lagos State,She was born into the family of Pa Joseph Akinyele Obayomi and Madam Agnes Kehinde Obayomi. She is the only daughter out of the three children in the family.She is married to Soji Alabi.  She hails from Yewa, Imeko of Ogun State, Nigeria. She obtained her West Africa School Certificate from Oba Akinyele Memorial High School, Ibadan, 1986. Thereafter, she proceeded to the Polytechnic Ibadan where she studied Mass Communication and graduated in 1990.

Alabi was formerly a member of the Jesters International comedy group. She later worked with other popular traveling and stage theater groups in both Ibadan and Lagos. She made films in the Yoruba film genre of Nigeria. Tope Alabi later changed her focus to gospel music after she became a born-again Christian. On 21 May 2019, Nigerians on Twitter crowned Tope Alabi the queen of Yoruba language as a result of a competition by United Bank for Africa on their 70th-anniversary celebration.

On 13 June 2021, she came under criticism for her comments on a song titled Oniduro Mi, which sparked outrage amongst other gospel artists.

She is married and has two daughters. She currently attends Living Faith Church.

Discography 
 Ore ti o Common (2001)
 Iwe Eri (2003)
 Agbara Re NI (2005)
 Agbara Olorun (2006)
 Angeli MI (2007)
 Kokoro Igbala (2008)
 Kabiosi (2010)
 Moriyanu
 Agbelebu (2011)
 Alagbara (2012)
 Agbelebu (2013)
 Oruko Tuntun (2015)
 Omo Jesu (2017)
 Yes & Amen (2018)
 Spirit of Light (TY Bello) (2019)
 Olorun Nbe Funmi (Iseoluwa)
 Eruretoba (TY Bello)
 Adonai (TY Bello)
 Awa Gbe Oga (TY Bello)
 Angeli (TY Bello)
 No One Else (TY Bello)
 Oba Mi De (TY Bello)
 Olowo Ina (TY Bello)
 War (TY Bello)
 Lowo Olorun Lowa(2020)
 Unless You Bless Me(2022)

References

External links

 

1970 births
Living people
Nigerian gospel singers
Musicians from Ibadan
Actresses from Ibadan
Yoruba women musicians
Yoruba actresses
Nigerian Christians
20th-century Nigerian actresses
Yoruba-language singers
Actresses in Yoruba cinema
21st-century Nigerian singers
Nigerian film actresses
The Polytechnic, Ibadan alumni